Rocklea railway station is located on the Beenleigh line in Queensland, Australia. It serves the Brisbane suburb of Rocklea. The station opened in 1885 at the same time as the line.

To the west of the station lies the NSW North Coast dual gauge line primarily used by Gold Coast, NSW TrainLink XPT and freight services.

In 1996, as part of the construction of the Gold Coast line, the standard gauge line was converted to dual gauge.

In 2022 construction began on the station upgrade as part of the Cross River Rail project, with platforms raised and lifts added to platforms and the carpark entry via Brooke Street.  The dual gauge track will also be provided with a platform.

Services
Rocklea station is served by all stops Beenleigh line services from Beenleigh, Kuraby and Coopers Plains to Bowen Hills and Ferny Grove.

Services by platform

References

External links

Rocklea station Queensland's Railways on the Internet
[ Rocklea station] TransLink travel information

Railway stations in Brisbane
Railway stations in Australia opened in 1885